2-deoxy-scyllo-inosamine dehydrogenase ((gene name), kanK (gene name)) is an enzyme with systematic name 2-deoxy-scyllo-inosamine:NAD(P)+ 1-oxidoreductase. This enzyme catalyses the following chemical reaction

 2-deoxy-scyllo-inosamine + NAD(P)+  3-amino-2,3-dideoxy-scyllo-inosose + NAD(P)H + H+

This enzyme requires zinc.

References

External links 
 

EC 1.1.1